Skip Peete (born January 30, 1963) is an American football coach who is the running backs coach for the Tampa Bay Buccaneers of the National Football League (NFL). Prior to the Buccaneers, he coached running backs for the Los Angeles Rams, Chicago Bears, Dallas Cowboys, and Oakland Raiders. He also has experience in college, coaching running backs for two years at UCLA, wide receivers at Michigan State and Rutgers, and both running backs and wide receivers at the University of Pittsburgh.

Playing career
In college, Peete was an All-Big Eight Conference wide receiver in 1985 with the Kansas Jayhawks.

Coaching career
In 1988, Peete began his coaching career when he became a graduate assistant at the University of Pittsburgh. In his final two seasons with Pitt, he coached future Pro Football Hall of Famer Curtis Martin. In his two seasons at Michigan State, he coached Muhsin Muhammad and Derrick Mason, who both went on to have successful NFL careers. During his stay at UCLA, he coached running back Skip Hicks to back-to-back 1,000 yard rushing seasons and 20 plus touchdowns and a Pac-10 record 55 career touchdowns.

NFL
With the Raiders, Tyrone Wheatley and LaMont Jordan recorded career highs in rushing yards with 1,046 in 2000 and 1,025 in 2005, respectively. During the 2002 Raiders season, Peete coached running back Charlie Garner to 962 yards rushing yards on 182 attempts to go along with 941 yards receiving on 91 catches. In 2007, his first year with the Cowboys, Peete helped Marion Barber make his first career Pro Bowl after rushing for career-highs in rushing yards (975) and touchdowns (10). Two years later, Peete guided the Cowboys running game to a franchise-record 4.8 yards per carry. He was subsequently hired by the Bears, reuniting him with former Raiders offensive coordinator and then-current Bears head coach Marc Trestman. Peete joined the Rams' coaching staff in 2016.

Personal life
Peete is the brother of former NFL quarterback, Rodney Peete. Peete's father Willie also served as running backs coach for the Bears from 1995 to 1997 before becoming a team scout. Peete and his wife Rebeca welcomed twins, Reeco (son) and Gisele (daughter) in April 2007.

References

External links
 Los Angeles Rams bio
  Chicago Bears bio

1963 births
Living people
African-American coaches of American football
African-American players of American football
American football wide receivers
Chicago Bears coaches
Dallas Cowboys coaches
Kansas Jayhawks football players
Michigan State Spartans football coaches
Oakland Raiders coaches
Players of American football from Tucson, Arizona
Pittsburgh Panthers football coaches
Rutgers Scarlet Knights football coaches
Sportspeople from Phoenix, Arizona
UCLA Bruins football coaches
21st-century African-American people
20th-century African-American sportspeople
Players of American football from Phoenix, Arizona